Prior to the Constitutional Reform Act 2005, nearly all Lord Chancellors were peers of the realm (if not already, then ennobled swiftly after taking office) and the principal presiding officer of the upper house of Parliament - now taken by the Lord Speaker. Shields of arms of former Chancellors are painted on the coving of the chamber (beneath the railings of the public viewing galleries) interspersed with the shields of arms of the monarchs whom they served.

Lord Chancellors in the reign of Queen Anne (1707–1714)

Lord Chancellors in the Georgian era (1714–1837)

Lord Chancellors in the Victorian and Edwardian eras (1837-1910)

Lord Chancellors in the reigns of King George V and his sons (1910–1952)

Lord Chancellors in the reign of Queen Elizabeth II (1952–2022)

References

Personal armorials
Armorials of the United Kingdom